Chateau Barka (شاتو باركا) is a vineyard and also a brand name in Barka, Baalbek, Lebanon. It is owned by Vigna Verde, which is a family business. 

The company exports the product to the Netherlands, Slovakia, France, Germany, Switzerland, Denmark, Finland, New Zealand, and Bahrain . It has plans to make an investment of USD 4 million to expand the vineyard.

References 

Vineyards
Baalbek District